Christopher Neal (born 27 June 1947) is an English former footballer who played as a winger in the Football League for Darlington.

Neal was born in Kirkby-in-Ashfield, Nottinghamshire. He joined Darlington as an amateur from Crook Town in June 1967, and made five first-team appearances for the club, all in the Fourth Division. He made his debut on 4 March 1968, in a 2–0 home win against Swansea Town, and started four of the next six league fixtures. He then returned to non-league football.

References

1947 births
Living people
People from Kirkby-in-Ashfield
Footballers from Nottinghamshire
English footballers
Association football wingers
Crook Town A.F.C. players
Darlington F.C. players
Shildon A.F.C. players
English Football League players